The Rundfunkanstalt Südtirol (Italian: Radiotelevisione Azienda Speciale, Ladin: Radiotelevijion- Azienda per Südtirol) is a public broadcasting service, completely funded by grants of the provincial government, for the majority German-speaking province of South Tyrol, Italy whose purpose is to relay programmes from the public broadcasters of Austria, Germany, German and Romansh Switzerland. The agency has its headquarters in the province's capital city Bolzano.
RAS is not related to the regional trilingual programme of RAI, the Italian public broadcaster.

History
When television broadcasts began, the German-speaking population of South Tyrol asked for the reception of the Austrian television station but it wasn't possible because RAI has the monopoly to have radio and television stations. In 1966 the Italian Government in Rome created the German-speaking broadcast of RAI from Bolzano called Rai Südtirol (back then Rai Sender Bozen) but the German-speaking population just wanted to have the possibility to watch the television station from Austria and perceived the offer from Rome suspiciously.
The German-speaking broadcast of the government-owned RAI was seen as a way to control the process of autonomy in the province. The provincial autonomy for South Tyrol in 1972 promised to create an agency whose purpose was to relay programmes from Austria and other German-speaking countries. The autonomous statute says that: The Province shall have the power to issue laws on local artistic, cultural and educational events and activities, and also through the media of radio and television, but without the power to set up radio and television stations. The RAS nowadays owns all transmitter towers in South Tyrol and has worked for the digitization of its broadcasting system. RAS cooperates with the local civil protection corps to give information to the people of South Tyrol in case of emergency.

Organization
RAS is a public company which is formed by a board elected for 2/3 by the Government of the Autonomous Province of South Tyrol. According to the agency the RAS employs 26 workers. While the Italian public broadcaster RAI is funded by licence fees and advertising, RAS is completely funded by provincial funds. All the public broadcasters give the possibility to RAS to relay their programmes without any cost (provincial citizens don't have to pay extra license fees). South Tyrol is actually the only province in Italy to have two public broadcasting services operating - the provincial German-language broadcast from RAI and the 6 RAS TV channels. The general director is Georg Plattner.

Programmes

Television
RAS relays television stations from the public broadcasters of Austria, Germany and Switzerland in digital terrestrial television using DVB-T. Analogue television was used between 1974 until the completion of the digitization process. Until the completion of the digitization process, the digital-only channels cannot be seen in either analog or vice versa. The network has completed its digitization process which started in 2007 and completed in November 2009. In some areas the terrestrial reception of some channels is not possible. The on-screen-design of RAS is a small writing down on the right of the screen.

Television channels carried by RAS:

Since 1975: ORF 1, ZDF
Since 1988: Das Erste, SF 1, ORF 2 
Since 2005: SF 2  
Since 2009: Bayerisches Fernsehen, KI.KA, ZDFneo 
Since 2010: 3sat, ARTE, La 1, ZDF HD, ORF 1HD, ORF 2HD.

Radio
RAS relays radio stations also from the public broadcasters of Austria, Germany and Switzerland in FM and DAB+.

Radio stations carried by RAS: Rai Radio 1, Rai Radio 2, Rai Radio 3, Rai Südtirol (radio), Ö1, Ö2 - Radio Tirol, Hitradio Ö3, FM4, Bayern 1, Bayern 2, Bayern 3, BR-Klassik, B5 aktuell, Radijojo, Radio Rumantsch, Radio Swiss Jazz, Radio Swiss Classic, Deutschlandradio Kultur (DAB+).

References

External links
 

Mass media companies established in 1975
German-language mass media in South Tyrol
Mass media companies of Italy
1975 establishments in Italy